Association Mauritanienne des Droits de l'Homme (AMDH) is a 
Mauritanian non-profit human rights non-governmental organization founded in 1991 Mauritania. It is based in Nouakchott. As of 2006, its president is Fatimata Mbaye.

AMDH is a member of International Federation of Human Rights Leagues (FIDH).

References

External links
 Official website

Human rights organisations based in Mauritania